The Worm of Death is a 1961 detective novel by the Anglo-Irish writer Cecil Day-Lewis, written under the pen name of Nicholas Blake. It is the fourteenth in a series of novels featuring the private detective Nigel Strangeways.

Synopsis
When Doctor Piers Loudron disappears from his Greenwich home and turn up soon afterwards in the River Thames, his family call in the services of Strangeways to protect their interests during the police investigation.

References

Bibliography
 Reilly, John M. Twentieth Century Crime & Mystery Writers. Springer, 2015.
 Stanford, Peter. C Day-Lewis: A Life. A&C Black, 2007.

1961 British novels
Novels by Cecil Day-Lewis
British crime novels
Collins Crime Club books
British detective novels
Novels set in London